Benjamin James Fritz (born March 29, 1981) is an American professional baseball coach and former pitcher. He is the bullpen coach for the San Diego Padres of Major League Baseball (MLB).

Career
Fritz attended Oak Grove High School in San Jose, California, and California State University, Fresno, where he played college baseball for the Fresno State Bulldogs. The Oakland Athletics selected Fritz in the first round, with the 30th overall selection, of the 2002 MLB draft. 

Fritz played in the Oakland organization from 2002 through 2007. He underwent Tommy John surgery in 2004. Fritz was selected by the Detroit Tigers in the minor league phase of the 2007 Rule 5 draft. After spending 2008 with Detroit, he played his final two seasons with the Lancaster Barnstormers of the independent Atlantic League.   

In 2015, Fritz joined the San Diego Padres organization as a coach for the AZL Padres. He served as the manager of the Tri-City Dust Devils in 2016 and 2017. Fritz served as rehabilitation coordinator for the Padres Arizona complex in 2018 and 2019.

Fritz was named the Padres bullpen coach following the 2019 season. When the Padres fired Larry Rothschild as their pitching coach in August 2021, they named Fritz the new pitching coach.

See also
Rule 5 draft results

References

External links

1981 births
Living people
American expatriate baseball players in Canada
Arizona League Athletics players
Baseball coaches from California
Baseball pitchers
Baseball players from San Jose, California
Erie SeaWolves players
Fresno State Bulldogs baseball players
Lancaster Barnstormers players
Leones del Caracas players
American expatriate baseball players in Venezuela
Major League Baseball bullpen coaches
Midland RockHounds players
Minor league baseball coaches
Minor league baseball managers
Modesto A's players
Sacramento River Cats players
San Diego Padres coaches
Stockton Ports players
Vancouver Canadians players
Visalia Oaks players